Drummond is an unincorporated, census-designated place located in the town of Drummond, Bayfield County, Wisconsin, United States.

U.S. Highway 63 serves as a main route in the community.  Drummond is located 31 miles southwest of the city of Ashland; and 26 miles northeast of the city of Hayward.

Drummond has a post office with ZIP code 54832. As of the 2010 census, its population was 154.

History
Drummond was founded in 1882. It was named for F. H. Drummond, an executive in the lumber industry. A post office has been in operation in Drummond since 1882.

References

Census-designated places in Bayfield County, Wisconsin
Census-designated places in Wisconsin